Izee is an unincorporated community in Grant County, Oregon, United States. Its post office operated from November 6, 1889, to July 31, 1954, and the first postmaster was Carlos W. Bonham. Located on the South Fork John Day River, Izee is a ranching community and was so named because a rancher there branded his cattle with the letters I. Z. The schoolhouse and grange building still stand as of 2019.

References

External links
History of Izee by the IZ Ranch
Photo of the Izee School courtesy of Curtis Irish
Photo of the Izee Community Hall courtesy of Curtis Irish
Photo of sunrise near Izee by Stren

Unincorporated communities in Grant County, Oregon
1889 establishments in Oregon
Populated places established in 1889
Unincorporated communities in Oregon